Wu Chia-jung (born 19 November 1977) is a Taiwanese baseball coach who currently coaches for Uni-President Lions of Chinese Professional Baseball League. He currently serves as baserunning coach for the Lions.

See also
 Chinese Professional Baseball League
 Uni-President Lions

References

1977 births
Living people
Taiwanese baseball players
People from Taitung County
Uni-President 7-Eleven Lions coaches